Kevin Shaw (born 1971) is an English cricketer.

Kevin Shaw may also refer to:

Kevin Shaw (athlete) in Tiberias Marathon
Kevin Shaw (soccer) on All-time Carolina Dynamo roster